Ostrovačice is a market town in Brno-Country District in the South Moravian Region of the Czech Republic. It has about 800 inhabitants.

Geography
It lies in the Boskovice Furrow.

History
The first written mention of Ostrovačice is from 1255. It was promoted to a market town by Ferdinand I of Austria in 1842.

Until 1918, Ostrovačice was a part of the Austrian monarchy (Austria side after the compromise of 1867), in the Brünn (Brno) District, in Moravia. The German name only was used before 1867.

Transport
The D1 motorway goes through the municipal territory.

Notable people
Zdeněk Pololáník (born 1935), composer; works here

References

External links

Populated places in Brno-Country District
Market towns in the Czech Republic